Kerekegyháza is a town in Bács-Kiskun county, in southern Hungary.

References

External links 

  in Hungarian

Populated places in Bács-Kiskun County
Towns in Hungary